The 9 cm Minenwerfer M 14 (trench mortar) was a light mortar used by Austria-Hungary in World War I. Originally named the '1-kg Minenwerfer', it was designed by the Army's own Technisches und Administratives Militär-Komitee (TMK) in an effort to quickly satisfy the demand from the front for a light mortar. 

It had a number of issues with its ammunition, namely the black powder used as a propellant, which gave off copious smoke clouds on firing that revealed the tube's location and the mortar bomb fuses had a high rate of failure. The breech-loading mortar tube was mounted on a framework that didn't allow for any traverse, which meant that it was impossible to engage different targets without relaying the mortar. In turn the frame was mounted a rectangular firing platform.

The M 14/16 had a circular platform to provide traverse and weighed only . A later model allowed the mounting to be collapsed for ease of transport. A new M 16 mortar bomb that used the German Poppenberg fuze system generally cured the dud problem, but it still used black powder as its propellant. This was a severe tactical disadvantage and it was decided to purchase replacement mortars from the German firm of Heinrich Lanz from 1917.

References

 Ortner, M. Christian. The Austro-Hungarian Artillery From 1867 to 1918: Technology, Organization, and Tactics. Vienna, Verlag Militaria, 2007 

Mortars of Austria-Hungary
Infantry mortars
90 mm artillery